Hatley is a Montreal-based retailer and wholesaler of gifts and apparel. Founded in 1987, the company is best-known for its PVC-free rain gear and cotton pajamas.



History 

John and Alice Oldland started Hatley as a cottage business in North Hatley, Québec, Canada, in 1986. Alice, an artist, opened a gift store called "The Little Blue House" and painted in her studio on the second floor. To help out at local charity events, Alice would donate hand-painted aprons, which were sold at auctions. John decided her designs would appeal to a broader market and he sold an initial 200 of them to kitchen stores the next time he was in Toronto.

When they retired in 1999, John and Alice handed the reins to their three sons, Chris, Nick and Jeremy. The three boys moved the company from North Hatley to Montréal and expanded their product range. They developed a children’s line, created women’s sleepwear and expanded into the gift market with napkins, kitchen textiles, mugs and other stuff.

As of 2022, products are sold in approximately 3,300 stores in North America and in over 20 countries. They have a direct-to-consumer website and 13 corporate stores in North America, with the last one opening in Annapolis, Maryland. In 2014, Hatley opened a warehouse in Portsmouth, England, to handle the UK and European market, and the first European store opened in July 2015 in Chiswick, London. Alongside the opening, the company also launched its UK website.

References

Clothing brands
Clothing retailers of Canada
Companies based in Montreal
Shops in Montreal
Underwear brands
Retail companies established in 1987